Justin Ress (born August 3, 1997) is an American swimmer. As a member of the USA national team Justin won the gold medal in the 50 meter backstroke at the 2022 FINA World Championships and was a member of the USA gold medal winning 4X100 free relay.  He was also a key part of the USA team that defeated Australia in the resumption of the Duel in the Pool series in 2022.  Ress  competed as a member of the Cali Condors of the International Swimming League from 2019-2021 and looks forward to resumption of ISL in the near future. Ress was US national champion in the 100 backstroke in 2022 and 50 backstroke in 2017 after which   he competed in the men's 50 meter backstroke event at the 2017 World Aquatics Championships. Ress swam collegiately for North Carolina State University where he was a 3-time NCAA champion, 21-time NCAA All-American, and 11-time ACC champion. In his first year at school he won the 2016 ACC Freshman of the Year award.

Early life
Ress is a native of Cary, North Carolina who attended Cary High School. He swam for Cary High School and trained with the Marlins of Raleigh, North Carolina. In 2014, he was a USA Swimming Scholastic All-American.

Career
At the 2017 US Nationals Ress won the 50 meter backstroke securing his spot on the World Championship roster. He finished in 24.41 to set a new championship record and beat the past two Olympic Champions in the 100 meter backstroke, Matt Grevers and Ryan Murphy, in the process. At the 2017 World Aquatics Championships in Budapest, Hungary Ress place 6th in the 50 meter backstroke. Ress was the runner up in the 50 meter backstroke (24.31) and finished third in the 100 meter backstroke (53.26), both personal bests, at the U.S. National Championships. His third-place finish in the 100 meter backstroke got him a spot on the 2018 Pan Pac team.

At the 2019 World University Games Ress earned a bronze medal in the 100 meter backstroke with a time of 53.81. He later tied for gold in the 50 meter backstroke with a time of 24.48. Ress ended his program with the 4×100 meter medley relay, where he led off Team USA in 53.31 en route to a gold medal.

In 2019 he was a member of the inaugural International Swimming League representing the Cali Condors, who finished third place in the final match in Las Vegas, Nevada in December. Ress showed his versatility by competed in sprint freestyle, backstroke, butterfly, and relays throughout the season.

At the 2020 Olympic Trials, Justin swam the 50 Freestyle and the 100 Backstroke. In the 100 Backstroke semifinals, he qualified 4th with a best time of 52.86, but failed to make the team the following day. On the Final day of the trials, he swam a 22.15 in the 50 Freestyle placing 7th, failing to qualify for the Olympic Team.

In August 2022, at the 2022 Australian Short Course Swimming Championships held in Sydney, Australia, Ress won the gold medal in the 50 meter backstroke with a time of 23.16 seconds and silver medals in the 50 meter freestyle and 100 meter freestyle, finishing only behind Kyle Chalmers of Australia in both events.

Career best times

Short course meters (25 m pool)

References

External links
 
 

1997 births
Living people
American male swimmers
Medalists at the 2017 Summer Universiade
Medalists at the 2019 Summer Universiade
Universiade medalists in swimming
Universiade gold medalists for the United States
Universiade silver medalists for the United States
Universiade bronze medalists for the United States
Place of birth missing (living people)
NC State Wolfpack men's swimmers
World Aquatics Championships medalists in swimming
People from Cary, North Carolina